Phyllidia exquisita is a species of sea slug, a dorid nudibranch, a shell-less marine gastropod mollusk in the family Phyllidiidae.

Distribution 
This species was described from Lion Island, Papua New Guinea. It has also been found in the Maldives, Sri Lanka and Indonesia.

Description
This nudibranch has a grey coloured dorsum with smaller white and larger yellow tubercles in irregular rows separated by black lines. The rhinophores are yellow and there is a yellow-orange margin at the edge of the mantle across the front of the head and the first quarter of the sides of the body.

Diet
This species feeds on a sponge.

References

External links
 

Phyllidiidae
Gastropods described in 1993